"You Give Me Something" is a song from British funk and acid jazz band Jamiroquai's fifth studio album, A Funk Odyssey (2001). The song was written by Jason Kay and was released in November 2001 as the second single from the album. The song peaked at 16 on the UK Singles Chart, number 17 in Spain, and number 30 in France. The song was the group's first single to be released on the DVD single format.

Music video
When asked what he thought of the music video for the song, Jay Kay said, "That video is crap [...] My original idea had been tampered with by everyone from the record company to the management." He proposed the video to be shot in Ibiza, then changed to New York City, but his flight there scheduled on 11 September 2001 had to be cancelled, "We ended up doing it in the Docklands in London in the pissing rain. I wasn't very happy with it."

Track listings

UK CD1
 "You Give Me Something" (commercial edit)
 "You Give Me Something" (Blacksmith RnB remix)
 "You Give Me Something" (Full Intention remix)
 "You Give Me Something" (Cosmos edit)
 "You Give Me Something" (King Unique edit)
 "You Give Me Something" (video)

UK CD2
 "You Give Me Something" (commercial edit)
 "You Give Me Something" (Full Intention remix)
 "Do It Like We Used to Do"
 "Main Vein" (live)
 "Main Vein" (video live at Knebworth)

UK DVD single
 "You Give Me Something" (video)
 "Do It Like We Used to Do" (audio)
 "Main Vein" (live audio)
 "Virtual Insanity" (video clip)
 "Cosmic Girl" (video clip)
 "Deeper Underground" (video clip)
 "Canned Heat" (video clip)

UK cassette single
 "You Give Me Something"
 "Do It Like We Used to Do"

European CD single
 "You Give Me Something" (commercial edit)
 "You Give Me Something" (Full Intention club mix)

US CD single
 "You Give Me Something" (Mike City remix) – 3:44
 "You Give Me Something" (Full Intention club mix) – 7:11
 "You Give Me Something" (Full Intention dub mix) – 7:22
 "You Give Me Something" (Blacksmith R&B remix) – 4:01

Australian CD single
 "You Give Me Something"
 "You Give Me Something" (King Unique Saki Session)
 "You Give Me Something" (Cosmos Deep Space Mix)
 "You Give Me Something" (Full Intention club mix)
 "You Give Me Something" (Blacksmith R&B 12-inch rub)

Charts

Release history

References

2000 songs
2001 singles
Columbia Records singles
Epic Records singles
Jamiroquai songs
Songs written by Jason Kay
S2 Records singles